The SR V class, more commonly known as the Schools class, is a class of steam locomotive designed by Richard Maunsell for the Southern Railway. The class was a cut down version of his Lord Nelson class but also incorporated components from Urie and Maunsell's LSWR/SR King Arthur class. It was the last locomotive in Britain to be designed with a 4-4-0 wheel arrangement, and was the most powerful class of 4-4-0 ever produced in Europe. All 40 of the class were named after English public schools, and were designed to provide a powerful class of intermediate express passenger locomotive on semi-fast services for lines which could cope with high axle loads but some of which had short turntables. Because of the use of a ‘’King Arthur’’ firebox, rather than the square-topped Belpaire firebox used on the Lord Nelsons, the class could be used on lines with a restricted loading gauge and some of the best performance by the class was on the heavily restricted Tonbridge to Hastings line. The locomotives performed well from the beginning but were subject to various minor modifications to improve their performance over the years. The class operated until 1961 when mass withdrawals took place and all had gone by December 1962. Three examples are now preserved on heritage railways in Britain.

Background 

By 1928 the Southern Railway was well served by large 4-6-0 express passenger locomotives, but there was an urgent need for a class to fulfil intermediate roles throughout the system. Maunsell’s previous attempt at developing his predecessor’s L class for this task had proven a disappointment, and the Drummond D15 and L12 classes were approaching the end of their useful lives on these services. An entirely new secondary express passenger locomotive was required to operate over the main lines throughout the system, including those that had relatively short turntables.

Design
Maunsell’s original plan was to use large-wheeled 2-6-4 tank engines for this purpose, but the Sevenoaks railway accident made him have second thoughts. He therefore chose a relatively short wheelbase 4-4-0 design although by this period 4-6-0 was more usual for this type of work. Authorities disagree as to whether Maunsell had in mind the restricted loading gauge of the Tonbridge to Hastings line when he designed the class, or whether this was an "unexpected bonus" when he was forced to substitute a "King Arthur" round-topped firebox to his planned Belpaire design to reduce the axle load on the driving wheels to acceptable limits. In either event the class was undoubtedly Maunsell's most immediately successful design, and the locomotives did some of their best work on the Hastings route.

Construction history 

The basic layout of the class was influenced by the existing ‘’Lord Nelson’’ class 4-6-0 design, but the use of the round topped firebox enabled Maunsell to design the cab's curved profile to fit the gauge restrictions of the Hastings line while allowing adequate forward visibility. The short frame length of the 4-4-0 locomotive also meant very little overhang on the line's tight curves. To maintain the high power rating required for express passenger engines, Maunsell opted for a three-cylinder design. In terms of tractive effort, the class was the most powerful 4-4-0 ever built in Britain, and were the only 4-4-0 type to be given the power classification of 5P by British Railways. They were well liked by crews. They also had a higher tractive effort than the nominally more powerful King Arthur class 4-6-0s, but at the cost of high axle-loading: . The permanent way on the Hastings line therefore had to be upgraded during 1929 and 1930 to accept the new locomotive.

Permission was granted for the first batch of fifteen locomotives in March 1928, but this was reduced to ten when it became apparent that they would not immediately be able to operate on the Hastings route. Production delays at Eastleigh railway works meant that they were not delivered until between March and July 1930. Once the original batch had proved their worth and had been well received by the crews a further twenty locomotives were ordered in March 1931 for delivery between December 1932 and March 1934. A third batch of twenty were ordered from Eastleigh in March 1932 for delivery after the completion of the previous order, but this was subsequently reduced to ten locomotives because of the continuing trade depression. The final locomotive in the class was delivered in July 1935.

Naming the locomotives
For location details and current status of the preserved locomotives including surviving artifacts of scrapped class members, see: List of SR V "Schools" class locomotives

The Southern Railway continued its 1923 naming policy for express passenger locomotives with this class. As several public schools were located on the Southern Railway network, the locomotives were named after them. This was another marketing success for both railway and schools concerned, continuing in the tradition of the N15 King Arthur and Lord Nelson classes.

Where possible, the Southern sent the newly constructed locomotive to a station near the school after which it was named for its official naming ceremony, when pupils were allowed to view the cab of "their" engine. Extension of the class meant that names from "foreign" schools outside the Southern Railway catchment area were used, including Rugby and Malvern.

Modifications
The class performed well from the outset, but there were a number of minor modifications over the years. The first ten were built without smoke deflectors, but these were added from August 1931, and the remaining thirty were fitted with them from new. Following the successful introduction of the Lemaître multiple jet blastpipes on to the Lord Nelson class, Maunsell's successor Oliver Bulleid began to fit them to the Schools class. However no discernible improvement to draughting was experienced, and only twenty examples were so modified, the most obvious change in their appearance being the large diameter chimney.

Operational use
The original ten locomotives were shared between Dover for use on the South Eastern Main Line and Eastbourne for London expresses. Several of the former later transferred to Ramsgate. By mid 1931 they began to be used on the Hastings services and as more locomotives became available later that year they also appeared on Portsmouth expresses. After the electrification of the London to Eastbourne and the London to Portsmouth routes in the late 1930s the class also began to be used from Bournemouth. Under British Railways they were also widely used on cross-country trains from Brighton to Cardiff and Exeter and on the Newhaven Boat Trains. Two locomotives (30902 and 30921) were briefly supplied with Lord Nelson tenders for use on the longer runs of the Western Section.

Achievements
The class was frequently regarded by locomotive crews as the finest constructed by the Southern Railway up to 1930, and could turn in highly spectacular performances for its size. However, there was a drawback with such high power and relatively low weight; when starting the locomotive from a standstill, wheelslips frequently occurred, calling for skilled handling on the footplate. The factor of adhesion, unusually, is below the usual design target of 4 although the smoother power delivery of the 3-cylinder layout compensates for this to some extent.

The reception given by footplate crews was such that more of the class were constructed for other parts of the network, although the electrification of the Southern's Eastern Section meant that they were dispersed from their original stamping grounds.

Withdrawal
The introduction of British Rail Class 201 diesel-electric multiple units to the Hastings route after 1957 and the completion of the electrification of the South Eastern Main Line in 1961 deprived the class of much of their work. Withdrawals began in January 1961 and the whole class had disappeared from service by December 1962.

Accidents and incidents
On 11 May 1941, locomotive No. 934 St. Lawrence was severely damaged at Cannon Street station, London in a Luftwaffe air raid.

Livery and numbering

Southern Railway 

When built, the Schools Class were outshopped in Maunsell's darker version of the LSWR passenger sage green livery lined in black and white, with cabside numberplates and "Southern" and the loco number on the tender in yellow. Later adaptations of the Southern Railway livery following Bulleid's arrival as Chief Mechanical Engineer entailed Malachite Green livery, again with "Sunshine Yellow" picking out the numbers and "Southern" on the tender (during the Second World War the locomotives were painted black with yellow lettering and numbers). The smoke deflectors – a later addition – were also treated with this livery. Numbers allocated to the locomotives were 900–939.

Post-1948 (nationalisation)

Initial livery after nationalisation in 1948 was modified Southern Railway malachite green and sunshine yellow with 'British Railways' on the tender, and the Southern numbering system was temporarily retained with an "S" prefix, e.g. S900. Following this the locomotives were repainted British Railways mixed traffic lined black and given the power classification 5P, as only the larger passenger locos were painted green.  This choice of livery proved an unpopular decision considering the locomotives' duties, and they were subsequently outshopped in British Railways brunswick green livery with orange and black lining as they became due for overhaul. By this stage the class had been renumbered under standard British Railways procedure, from 30900 to 30939.

Preservation
Three members of the class have been preserved and all three have run in preservation with 30925 & 30926 also running at certain points on the mainline.

Loco numbers in bold mean their current number.

925, Cheltenham, is part of the National Railway Collection. Currently at the Mid Hants having undergone overhaul by a team from the Mid Hants Railway (led by Chris Smith) at Eastleigh Works. On completion, the locomotive featured at Railfest in June 2012 and then returned to the Mid Hants (on 26/28 June) where it will be based on long-term loan from the NRM. It joins fellow Maunsell Southern Railway engine Lord Nelson Class No. 850 Lord Nelson. In 1980 it took part in the Rocket 150 celabrations and later the parade at Rainhill on the Liverpool and Manchester Railway. The engine travelled to and from the event on the mainline under its own power. 

926, Repton, is owned by the North Yorkshire Moors Railway. It was completed in May 1934 and entered service on the Bournemouth route, with some time operating between Waterloo and Portsmouth before that line was electrified. It was the last of the class to be overhauled by British Railways in October 1960, so was considered an excellent choice for preservation. In December 1962 the engine was withdrawn from service, and it was purchased for preservation in the United States, and later donated by the purchaser to Steamtown, U.S.A. in Bellows Falls, Vermont. It was cosmetically overhauled at Eastleigh in 1966 before being shipped across the Atlantic. Steamtown loaned the engine to the Cape Breton Steam Railway in Canada, where it operated a regular passenger service. In 1989 it was sold again, and returned to the UK to the NYMR, where it was again overhauled and found to be in good condition. Recently returned to service following an overhaul. 30926 has also operated on the mainline between Whitby and Grosmont with occasional visits to Battersby.
928 Stowe, was built in 1934 at a cost of £5,000 by the Eastleigh locomotive works of the Southern Railway. It recorded more than a million miles of passenger service operation during 28 years of Southern main line use. It was purchased from British Railways for Lord Montagu's National Motor Museum on withdrawal in 1962; its road delivery to Beaulieu was covered for a Look at Life documentary episode, Turn of the Wheel. After standing in the open for some years, it was moved to the East Somerset Railway in 1973, and then to the Bluebell Railway where it was put into running order by the Maunsell Locomotive Society, entering service in 1981. It ran for the length of its ten-year boiler ticket and was withdrawn from service in 1991. 'Stowe' was purchased by the MLS from Lord Montagu in September 2000, thus securing its future at the Bluebell. The purchase was funded in part by the sale of S15 class no. 830, which subsequently moved to the North Yorkshire Moors Railway where it awaits restoration to working order. In 2003 the tender was completely rebuilt, with a brand new tank being built. 'Stowe' is now undergoing a full overhaul to working order, with funds being raised through the Bluebell's 'Keep Up The Pressure' campaign.

Models
The erstwhile Kitmaster company produced an unpowered polystyrene injection moulded model kit for 00 gauge, which went on sale in March 1959. In late 1962, the Kitmaster brand was sold by its parent company (Rosebud Dolls) to Airfix, who transferred the moulding tools to their own factory; they re-introduced some of the former Kitmaster range, including the Schools class locomotive in May 1968. In time, the moulding tools passed on to Dapol who have also produced the model kit. Crownline Models produce an etched chassis kit
to permit this model to be motorised.

Hornby produce a super-detail and a cheaper railroad version based on their old tender drive OO gauge model of the Schools Class.

Gladiator Models (Britain) Makes an O gauge (7mm) photo etched brass kit with cast brass and white metal details.

Mettoy produced an O Gauge clockwork model of the Eton 900.

Hornby produced an O Gauge model of Eton in 1937, both clockwork and electric versions being available.

Dapol produce an N gauge model Schools with several name versions.

References

Notes

Bibliography

See also 
 List of SR V "Schools" class locomotives

External links 

 Maunsell V "Schools" class 4-4-0 Southern E-Group
 Class V Details at Rail UK

V
4-4-0 locomotives
Railway locomotives introduced in 1930
Standard gauge steam locomotives of Great Britain
2′B h3 locomotives
Passenger locomotives